Eacles acuta is a moth of the  family Saturniidae. It is found in South America, including French Guiana.

The wings are yellow with large orange patches near the tips and the wingtips are pointed. The body is orange.

References

Ceratocampinae
Moths described in 1905